In mathematical set theory, Chang's model is the smallest inner model of set theory closed under countable sequences. More generally Chang introduced the smallest inner model closed under taking sequences of length less than κ for any infinite cardinal κ. For κ countable this is the constructible universe, and for κ the first uncountable cardinal it is Chang's model.

References
 

Inner model theory